KTJO-FM (88.9 FM) was a radio station broadcasting a modern rock music format. Licensed to Ottawa, Kansas, United States, the station was owned by Ottawa University.

The University surrendered the station's license to the Federal Communications Commission (FCC) on January 7, 2016; the FCC cancelled the license and deleted the call sign from the database on January 8.

References

External links
 

Modern rock radio stations in the United States
TJO-FM
Radio stations established in 1975
TJO-FM
1975 establishments in Kansas
Defunct radio stations in the United States
Radio stations disestablished in 2016
Ottawa University
2016 disestablishments in Kansas
TJO-FM